Elaeocarpus simaluensis is a species of flowering plant in the Elaeocarpaceae family. It is found only in Sumatra.

References

simaluensis
Endemic flora of Sumatra
Vulnerable plants
Taxonomy articles created by Polbot